Bellevue Christian School (BCS) is a private, interdenominational Christian school serving grades preschool-12, located in Clyde Hill, Washington. BCS is a Northwest Association of Independent Schools member and is a part of the Nisqually League, a high school athletic conference located in the greater Seattle area. The school was founded in 1950 by brothers Dr. Albert and Joseph Greene. Since its inception, the student population at Bellevue Christian School has grown from 9 students to over 900 students.

Affiliation 

Bellevue Christian School is an independent Christian school. The school body represents a denominationally diverse range of more than 160 congregations.

History 

Founded by brothers Albert and Joseph Greene in 1950, BCS has grown to serve approximately 900 students on three campuses. The school's mission statement is: 'To prepare young people to live faithfully for God in a rapidly changing world with the ability to understand, evaluate, and transform their world from the foundation of God’s unchanging values.' Vision: 'Preparing young people to live faithfully for God.'

Locations 

The Central Office, Junior High/Senior High campus is located in Clyde Hill.
Three Points Campus Preschool and Elementary is nearby Medina.
Mack Campus Preschool and Elementary is in Woodinville.

Academics 

Bellevue Christian School is approved by the State of Washington and accredited by Christian Schools International and the Northwest Association of Accredited Schools (NAAS).

The high school academic program includes AP classes in English, World and U.S. History, Calculus (AB and BC), Biology, Physics, Spanish and Studio Art. BCS is noted for its music program, which includes three choirs and three bands, including a symphonic wind ensemble, jazz band, and select Choir. Alumni attend a variety of universities including Ivy League Schools, Military Academies, State Schools, Christian schools, and Community Colleges.

Co-Curricular Activities 
BCS is a member of the Washington Interscholastic Athletic Association (WIAA)  and participates in the Nisqually League. BCS offers 16 different high school varsity sports (9 boys, 7 girls) including baseball, basketball, cross country, football, golf, soccer, track, volleyball and wrestling.
A number of JV sports teams are available as well.

In addition, high school students can participate in a fall or spring play.
At the junior high level, all sports are no-cut, ensuring all students have an opportunity to participate in the sport of their choice.

Current Enrollment (2018) 
High School - 368
Junior High - 145
Total Elementary - 360
Total Preschool - 124

Distinctives 

Students, teachers, parents, and administrators are encouraged to practice servant leadership according to Jesus' teachings. Conflict resolution follows the model found in Matthew 18  where community members are encouraged to seek personal reconciliation, rather than simply appealing to school administrators as a first step. 
BCS aims to keep tuition relatively affordable by local standards so that it can serve whole families and remain accessible to a range of families. Students do not submit test scores in the admission process, since the school philosophy stresses the giftedness of all students, not just those who achieve high test scores. 
BCS offers Special Academic Services (SAS) to students who need help in strengthening their learning skills and equipping them with processing tools. SAS is affiliated with the National Institute of Learning Development and is based on neurological therapy. BCS is one of the few private, religious or secular schools to offer SAS therapy.

Notable alumni
 Mark Arm, musician
 Sarah McIntyre, children's book writer and illustrator
Cathrine Kraayeveld, former WNBA basketball player. Attended Bellevue Christian School freshman and sophomore year before transferring.
Hans Struzyna, Olympic rower who competed in the 2016 Summer Olympics.

References

External links
Bellevue Christian School website

Christian schools in Washington (state)
Private elementary schools in Washington (state)
Private middle schools in Washington (state)
High schools in King County, Washington
Educational institutions established in 1950
Private high schools in Washington (state)
1950 establishments in Washington (state)